The Autoroute 6, abbreviated to A6 or otherwise known as the Arlon motorway, is a motorway in southern and western Luxembourg. At Kleinbettingen, it reaches the Belgian border, whereupon it meets the A4, which leads to Brussels via Arlon and Namur.

Overview
The A6 forms part of the E25 from Hook of Holland in the Netherlands to Palermo in Italy.

The A6 was opened in three separate sections:
 1976: Croix de Cessange - Strassen
 1978: Croix de Gasperich - Croix de Cessange
 1982: Strassen - Belgian Autoroute 4 at Kleinbettingen

Route

References

External links 

  Administration des Ponts et Chaussées

Motorways in Luxembourg